The Schleswig-Holstein-Sonderburg-Franzhagen line was a short-lived name of the main line of the ducal house of Schleswig-Holstein-Sonderburg, after its bankruptcy in 1667.  The name is derived from the Franzhagen Castle in Schulendorf in the duchy of Saxe-Lauenburg.  The castle was inherited by Eleonore Charlotte of Saxe-Lauenburg-Franzhagen, who brought it into her marriage with former Duke Christian Adolph I.  After their bankruptcy, the Sonderburg line was reduced to its possession of Franzhagen.  The Franzhagen castle was demolished in 1716.

List of Dukes 

The real power of government from 1702 was wielded by Eleonore Charlotte of Saxe-Lauenburg-Franzhagen, the widow of Christian Adolf I, as the sons had married beneath their station.  Anna Barbara Dorothea of Winterfeld never owned more than a house in Billwerder, until her death in 1739.

See also 
 House of Oldenburg

References 
 Mecklenburgische Jahrbücher, Vol. 31–32, p.17f, Ludwig Karl von Franzhagen
 Mecklenburgische Jahrbücher, Vol. 31–32, p.13f, Leopold Christian von Franzhagen

German noble families
Sonderburg-Franzhagen

1676 establishments in the Holy Roman Empire